Luis Giovanny Ruiz Guerrero (born 2 May 1975) is a Colombian football manager, currently in charge of Deportivo Pasto's youth categories.

Career
Born in Pasto, Ruiz joined hometown side Deportivo Pasto in 2002, being named manager of the youth categories. In the 2011 Categoría Primera B winning campaign, he was a fitness coach of the main squad.

In 2014, Ruiz managed Pasto on three Copa Colombia matches, as the club played with the under-20 squad as the first team was unavailable due to a strike. On 27 March 2015, he was named interim manager after the departure of Óscar Quintabani. He remained in the role until the appointment of Guillermo Berrío as manager in May.

In the 2020 season, Ruiz was in charge of Pasto's women's squad. On 10 April of the following year, he was again named interim after Diego Corredor was sacked, and was permanently appointed manager on 22 June.

References

External links

1975 births
Living people
People from Pasto, Colombia
Colombian football managers
Categoría Primera A managers
Deportivo Pasto managers
Sportspeople from Nariño Department